Donzenac is a commune in the Corrèze department in central France.

Geography
Commune of the urban area of Brive-la-Gaillarde located in the Massif Central on the national road N20, 10 km north of Brive-la-Gaillarde.

Perched on an outcrop dominating the Maumont, resulting from the confluence of the Maumont Blanc and the Maumont Noir. Another tributary of the Maumont, the Clan stream waters the western part of the communal territory.

The Château district, Donzenac, a former fortified village, still retains its medieval appearance with its high walls, narrow, winding lanes that all return to the Church district.

The village of Travassac, located 3 km above the town, is one of the most important hamlets of the commune. It is a typical village once inhabited by slate workers who worked in the quarry.

This hamlet is home to a vertically operated former open slate quarry. This unique site in Europe is now open to the public.

Population

See also
Communes of the Corrèze department

References

Communes of Corrèze